The 2019–20 BC Žalgiris season is the 76th season in the existence of the club. The club has been playing in the Betsafe-LKL, King Mindaugas Cup and the EuroLeague.

Overview 
During the off-season, Aaron White, Brandon Davies, Nate Wolters, Léo Westermann and Deon Thompson left, while Antanas Kavaliauskas announced retirement. Little used guard Donatas Sabeckis was also not re-signed. Lukas Lekavičius returned to the team after two seasons in Greece, and Alex Pérez was signed to replace Westermann. Jock Landale was signed to replace Davies, while Nigel Hayes was signed to replace White. Zach LeDay of Olympiacos was signed to complete the front court. Martinas Geben, signed to a long-term deal the previous summer, earned a spot on the roster after a successful season in Juventus Utena in the LKL, where he was named Season MVP. Marius Grigonis, who had a great season, was resigned to new contract. Coach Šarūnas Jasikevičius remained with the team for one more season.

Žalgiris won the King Mindaugas Cup, getting revenge and beating BC Rytas 80–60 in the finals. Edgaras Ulanovas was named the MVP of the tournament, his fourth such award in Lithuanian Cup competitions.

Season suspension 

Due to the COVID-19 pandemic, the 2019-20 LKL season was ended prematurely, and with Žalgiris firmly leading the standings, Žalgiris was announced as the champion of the LKL, winning their 10th consecutive LKL championship. On 12 March 2020, Euroleague announced it was suspending its competitions due to the same reason.

Players

Squad information

Depth chart

On loan

Transactions

Players In

|}

Players Out

|}
Notes:
 1 On loan during the 2018–19 season.

Club

Technical Staff 

Source:

Pre-season games

Competitions

Overview

Betsafe-LKL

Regular season

Results summary

Results by round

Matches

Postponed matches

EuroLeague

Regular season

Results summary

Results by round

Matches

Postponed matches

King Mindaugas Cup

The 2020 King Mindaugas Cup was 5th instance of the tournament presented to public on 1 December 2015, to replace the LKF Cup and the LKL All-Star Day. Final Four tournament was held in Švyturio arena, Klaipėda. Žalgiris set the new King Mindaugas Cup record, defeating Rytas 80:60  and becoming new Cup holders. Edgaras Ulanovas was named the Finals MVP. Forward scored 13 points, dished three assists, stole the ball twice and recorded 16 efficiency rating. It was the third time Ulanovas became King Mindaugas Cup Finals MVP.

Individual Awards

King Mindaugas Cup Finals MVP 
 Edgaras Ulanovas

Statistics

Betsafe-LKL

EuroLeague

References

External links
 BC Žalgiris official website
 BC Žalgiris at the Betsafe-LKL
 BC Žalgiris at the EuroLeague

BC Žalgiris
Kauno Žalgiris
Kauno Žalgiris
Kauno Žalgiris